The Cárcel del Saladero (English: The Saladero Prison) also known as Cárcel de Villa, was a prison in the Spanish city of Madrid, operational during the 19th century. The name of the prison arose from its original use for bacon salting (saladero de tocino).

References 

Prisons in Spain